Andreas Johansen (29 November 1901 – 12 September 1978) was a Norwegian footballer. He played in four matches for the Norway national football team from 1924 to 1928.

References

External links
 

1901 births
1978 deaths
Norwegian footballers
Norway international footballers
Place of birth missing
Association footballers not categorized by position